Athamanians or Athamanes (Athamanes) were an ancient Greek tribe that inhabited south-eastern Epirus and west Thessaly. Today, the municipal unit of Athamania in Central Tzoumerka and the community of Athamania in Pyli are named after them.

History

Although they were regarded as "barbarians" by Strabo and Hecataeus of Miletus, the Athamanians affirmed that they were Greeks and they were also seen as Greeks by Plato who stated “the descendants of Athamas are Greek, of course” (Οι έκγονοι του Αθάμαντος, Έλληνες γάρ). In addition, modern scholarship considers the Athamanians to have been a Greek tribe. The existence of Greek myths about Athamas and Ino in Achaean Phthiotis suggests that the Athamanians were settled there before 1600 BC. They were an independent tribe (except during their subjugation by Pyrrhus of Epirus in 281–272 BC and by the Macedonians in 191 BC), and were occasionally allies of the Aetolians. Amynander and Theodorus of Athamania are reported kings of the Athamanians.

Timeline

See also
Aetolians
List of Ancient Greek tribes
Molossians
Northwest Greek

References

Sources

Greek tribes
Ancient tribes in Epirus
Ancient tribes in Thessaly